The Scottish Gaelic Football Championship is a knockout and the principal competition played between Scottish GAA Clubs in Scotland.

History
The first Championship was played in 1985, when Clan Na Gael were the inaugural winners.

Men's  Finals

References

www.tirconaillharps.com

 
Gaelic Football
Recurring sporting events established in 1985